Codename:Rondo is an album by Ghostland Observatory. It was released in 2010 via Red Green Catalog.

Critical reception
The New York Times praised "That's Right," writing that "it’s both a classic pop singalong and, perhaps more innovatively, a stab at giving the blues a futuristic face lift."

Track listing

References 

2010 albums
Ghostland Observatory albums